Jump is a South Korean sitcom that aired on MBC in 1999.

Cast
Main cast
 Seo Kyung-seok
 Gu Bon-seung
 Choi Bool-am
 Chae Rim

Supporting cast
 Kim Sun-a
 Go Soo
 Zo In-sung
 Yoon Tae-young
 Park Gwang-hyun
 Yang Mi-ra
 Kwak Jung-wook
 Hong Seok-cheon
 Park Shi-eun
 Kim Jung-kyoon
 Yang Jung-kyoon
 Moon Cheon-shik
 Seo Beom Shik
 Lee Kyung Shil
 Choi Sang-hak
 Hong Jin Kyung

External links 
 Jump at MBC 

South Korean television sitcoms
MBC TV television dramas